The Keralas or Udra Keralas were a royal dynasty mentioned in Sanskrit epics of ancient India. In the Mahabharata, the Keralian Empire took part in the Kurukshetra War by feeding both armies. According to the Puranas, the navigators and survivors of the Yadavas of Dwaraka also settled in Kerala later. Some remnants of the Naga culture are also found here.

This Kerala Kingdom has been identified with the Chera kingdom, which existed from the 5th century BCE to the 12th century CE in present-day Kerala state and Tamil Nadu in South India. The Pandyas, Cheras and the Cholas were mentioned in Tamil literature (consisting of Silappatikaram, Tirukkural etc.), complementing their mention in the existing Sanskrit literature (constituted by the Puranas, Vedas, Ramayana and the Mahabharata).

Legend of King Mahabali

Remembrance of King Mahabali 
The modern people of Kerala, Karnataka along with other southern states of India, celebrate the King Mahabali who it is believed, was the Emperor of Bharatavarsha in pre-ancient times, several aeons ago. The biggest festival of Kerala is Onam, celebrated in the remembrance of King Mahabali. Mahabali was described in ancient Indian texts as belonging to the Asuras, who were half-siblings of Devas.

Relationship between the Asuras and Bhargavas 
Small pockets of Asura regions existed in Northern India and regions beyond the Himalayas as well. Vrishaparvan, was a famous Asura King. The founder of the Puru dynasty of kings (described in the epic Mahabharata as the forefather of the Pandavas and Kauravas), viz King Puru, was the son of Sarmishta, the daughter of King Vrishaparvan. Vrishaparvan's priest was the sage Sukra, (alias Venus), who was a Bhargava (the son or a descendant of the sage Bhrigu.) Often, the Asura Kings chose sages in the line of Bhrigu as their priests, whereas the Devas chose sages in the line of Brihaspati or Angiras, as their priests. Mahabali was yet another king whose priest also was named Sukra, in the line of Bhrigu.

The role of Vamana 

The legend of Vamana coming and disrupting the sacrifice of Mahabali is as follows:- Vamana (meaning a dwarf-bodied man), who was a small Brahmin Boy, came and requested of the King Mahabali, three feet of land as alms, for his daily use and for practising his daily ceremonial customs. Mahabali agreed to it, in spite of the warning by the Bhargava Sukra, his priest. Vamana, after getting the consent of the King, started to measure the three feet of land he wanted. But prior to that, he grew in size to unimaginably large, and then he measured the land he wanted in just two steps - the first covering all-sky, and the second taking up all earth, and therefore in effect, covered the whole of Mahabali's Kingdom. Upon Mahabali's own request, (so as to be able to fulfil his given promise of three feet of land), Vamana placed his third step on the head of Mahabali and sent him to the netherworld. Vamana stands as the guard of Mahabali in the netherworld. Vamana also gave Mahabali a boon, that his subjects and everybody else in all the ages to come, would always remember him as a great, virtuous and true King forever, and that every year he would be able to come and see them. It is to supposedly commemorate his arrival every year that the festival of Onam is celebrated. This event is commemorated in Karnataka with the festival of Bali padyami that's observed every year on first day after amavase full moon night that marks the beginning of karthika masa or to be precise this festival is celebrated during deepavali every year. 

In terms of modern scholarship, and according to the existing line of thinking with regard to recorded Indian History, this legend can be interpreted as follows. Vamana represents the arrival of a new foreign tribe into the Kingdom of Mahabali. Since Vamana was described as the son of Sage Kashyapa this new tribe could be the Kashyapa tribe. They asked the King for a small piece of land for their settling in his Kingdom. The King consented to it, in spite of the warning of his priest, the Bhargava Sukra. The Bhargavas were already aware of the Kashyapas as another priest-class but as having adherence to the Deva group of beings. The consequence of this consent by Mahabali was that the Kashyapas, starting from their small settlement permitted for occupation by the King, spread throughout the Kingdom of Mahabali and finally overthrew him or his Dynasty from his Kingship. Mahabali was later forgotten and existed only in the minds of his loyal subjects as a great King.

The transfer of power from the Bhargavas to the Kashyapas might also be interpreted from the legend of Bhargava Rama, where it is described that Bhargava Rama, after overthrowing the Kshatriya rulers of Central India, took the lordship of their lands and transferred the lands and the wealth to the Kashyapas, before retiring to the woods.

Thus the legend of Vamana, can be interpreted in a way to signify the transfer of power from the Asura Kings and their Bhargava Priests, to the Deva worshipping rulers and their Kashyapa Priests.

Roles of Sages Agastya and Vasistha 

The Sage Agastya was very popular in the South Indian Kingdoms including the Kerala Kingdom. Agastya was described as a brother of Sage Vasistha. Sage Vasistha is also linked with the story of the Kerala tribe as per the epic Mahabharata. (See Mbh 1.177 and the section named The Myth regarding the birth of Kerala Tribe) This epic also says that Agastya and Vasistha were the sons of the ancient Devas Mitra and Varuna. Both were Gods common to the Deva and Asura groups of pre-ancient beings. But the Deva group demoted Varuna, who was one of the important deities of both the groups, to the status of the Sea-God while Indra took over the role of Varuna as the main God for them. But the Asura group maintained their reverence for both Varuna and Mitra.

It is believed, that there was a hermitage of Agastya near Panchavati or Nasik, where Raghava Rama made his temporary abode. There are numerous places in Kerala and Tamil Nadu, believed to be related to Agastya, like Agastyavata, Agasteswara, etc. The attribution of Sage Agastya, as a son of the Sea-God Varuna, could be due to his being good at sea navigation and probably sea warfare as well. Indra and other Devas sought the help of Agastya, in defeating a clan of Asuras called Kalakeyas, who were ferocious sea-warriors.

References of Keralas in the Mahabharata

The story about the origin of the Keralas

Mahabharata, Book 1, Chapter 177

When the sage Vasistha was attacked by king Viswamitra's army, Vasistha's cow, Kamadehnu, brought forth from her tail, an army of Palhavas, and from her udders, an army of Dravidas and Sakas; and from her womb, an army of Yavanas, and from her dung, an army of Savara's; and from her urine, an army of Kanchis; and from her sides, an army of Savaras. And from the froth of her mouth came out hosts of Paundras and Kiratas, Yavanas, Sinhalas, Khasas, Chivukas, Pulindas, Chinas, Hunas, Keralas, and also the Mlechchhas.

List of provinces of Bharata Varsha (Ancient India)

Chapter (6:9) of Mahabharata mentions the kingdoms and provinces of ancient India (Bharata Varsha). In this list we found mention of Keralas two times, on along with many north Indian kingdoms like Videha and Magadha and the other along with South Indian kingdoms like the Dravidas, the Mushikas, Karanatakas, the Mahishakas the Cholas etc.

Keralas in North India:- .....the Aswakas, the Pansurashtras, the Goparashtras, and the Karityas; the Adhirjayas, the Kuladyas, the Malla-Rashtras, the Keralas, the Varatrasyas, the Apavahas, the Chakras, the Vakratapas, the Sakas; the Videhas, the Magadhas.

Keralas in South India:-  There are other kingdoms in the south. They are the Dravidas, the Keralas, the Prachyas, the Mushikas, and the Vanavashikas; the Karanatakas, the Mahishakas, the Vikalpas, and also the Mushakas; the Jhillikas, the Kuntalas, the Saunridas, and the Nalakananas; the Kankutakas, the Cholas, and the Malavayakas; the Samangas, the Kanakas, the Kukkuras, and the Angara-marishas; the Samangas, the Karakas, the Kukuras, the Angaras, the Marishas.

Sahadevas military campaign

Mahabharata, Book 2, Chapter 30

Sahadeva vanquished and brought under his subjection numberless kings of the Mlechchha tribe living on the sea coast, and the Nishadas and the cannibals and even the Karnapravarnas, and those tribes also called the Kalamukhas who was a cross between human beings and Rakshasas, and the whole of the Cole mountains, and also Surabhipatna, and the island called the Copper island, and the mountain called Ramaka. He, having brought under subjection king Timingila, conquered a wild tribe known by the name of the Kerakas who were men with one leg (probably mentioning people living along with the trees with one trunk i.e. the coconut tree).

He also conquered the town of Sanjayanti and the country of the Pashandas and the Karanatakas by means of his messengers alone and made all of them pay tributes to him. The hero brought under his subjection and exacted tributes from the Paundrayas and the Dravidas along with the Udra-Keralas and the Andhras and the Talavanas (Telingas?), the Kalingas and the Ushtrakarnikas, and also the delightful city of Atavi and that of the Yavanas. Having arrived at the seashore, he then dispatched messengers unto the illustrious Vibhishana (of Lanka), the grandson of Pulastya.

Keralas role in the Kurukshetra War

Mahabharata, Book 8, Chapter 12

The Pandavas, headed by Vrikodara (Bhima), advanced against the Kauravas. They consisted of Dhrishtadyumna and Shikhandi and the five sons of Draupadi and the Prabhadrakas, and Satyaki and Chekitana with the Dravida forces, and the Pandyas, the Cholas, and the Keralas, surrounded by a mighty array, all possessed of broad chests, long arms, tall statures, and large eyes.

Karna's opinion about the Keralas
Mahabharata, Book 8, Chapter 44

Karna, due to his enmity towards Shalya, who was from the Vahlika tribe of Madra, dislikes all these tribes that had cultures similar to that of Shalya. Thus he rebukes many cultural traits of this group, including that of a sister's son inheriting property rather than one's own son.

There (Punjab) where the five rivers flow just after issuing from the mountains, there among the Aratta-Vahikas, no respectable person should dwell even for two days. There are two Pishacas named Vahi and Hika in the river Vipasa. The Vahikas are the offspring of those two Pishacas. The Karashakas, the Mahishakas, the Kalingas, the Keralas, the Karkotakas, the Virakas, and other peoples of no religion, one should always avoid.

See also

Kingdoms of Ancient India
Kerala Kingdom, Cheras, Tamil, Odra Kingdom, Konkana Kingdom, Dwaraka Kingdom, Sinhala Kingdom, Lanka Kingdom.

References
 Mahabharata of Krishna Dwaipayana Vyasa, translated into English by Kisari Mohan Ganguli

External links
 

 Kingdoms in the Mahabharata